Leones is a corregimiento in Montijo District, Veraguas Province, Panama with a population of 224 as of 2010. Its population as of 1990 was 284; its population as of 2000 was 297. As of 2010, it had a population of 224.

References

Corregimientos of Veraguas Province